Douglas John Janik (born March 26, 1980) is an American former professional ice hockey defenseman who played in the National Hockey League (NHL). He last played for the SV Kaltern of the Italian Serie A before ending his playing career.

Playing career
As a youth, Janik played in the 1994 Quebec International Pee-Wee Hockey Tournament with a minor ice hockey team from Springfield, Massachusetts.

Janik was drafted 55th overall, in the second round, by the Buffalo Sabres in the 1999 NHL Entry Draft. Janik played collegiate hockey for the University of Maine before making his professional debut with the Sabres' affiliate, the Rochester Americans of the American Hockey League in 2001–02.

On July 6, 2006, Janik signed as a free agent with the Tampa Bay Lightning. He played his first full NHL season in 2006–07 and appeared in 136 games over two seasons.

Janik was signed as an unrestricted free agent by the Chicago Blackhawks on July 15, 2008; before playing for the Blackhawks, though, he was claimed off waivers by the Dallas Stars for the start of the 2008–09 season on October 2, 2008. He was then claimed off waivers by Chicago on October 8, only to be immediately traded back to Dallas for a conditional draft pick. After appearing in 13 games with the Stars and being used mainly as a reserve defenseman, he was traded to the Montreal Canadiens for Steve Bégin on February 26, 2009. After clearing waivers, Janik was then assigned to affiliate the Hamilton Bulldogs of the AHL. Janik played his first game with the Montreal Canadiens on April 6, 2009, against the Ottawa Senators.

Janik was traded by the Canadiens, along with Chris Higgins and Ryan McDonagh to the New York Rangers for Scott Gomez, Tom Pyatt, and Michael Busto on the eve of free agency on June 30, 2009.

Unsigned by the Rangers, Janik became a free agent and on July 8, 2009, signed a one-year contract with the Detroit Red Wings. After starting the 2009–10 season with AHL affiliate, the Grand Rapids Griffins, he made his Red Wing debut on November 3, 2009, against the Boston Bruins. He played 13 games with the Wings before recording a career high 37 points with the Griffins. On June 10, 2010, Janik was re-signed by the Red Wings to a two-year contract.

On July 12, 2012, Janik signed a one-year contract with Adler Mannheim of the German DEL. During the 2012–13 season, Janik contributed with 10 points in 40 games from the Blueline. He was not tendered a new contract offer at season's end.

On November 25, 2013, Janik signed with the San Antonio Rampage of the AHL. After 13 games with the Rampage, Janik's AHL rights were included in a trade to the Chicago Wolves on March 2, 2014.

On October 21, 2014, he signed as a free agent a contract with SV Caldaro of the Italian Serie A.

On July 21, 2015, Janik signalled the conclusion of his playing career upon accepting an assistant coaching position with the Arizona Coyotes AHL affiliate, the Springfield Falcons.

Career statistics

Regular season and playoffs

References

External links

1980 births
Living people
American men's ice hockey defensemen
Buffalo Sabres draft picks
Buffalo Sabres players
Chicago Wolves players
Dallas Stars players
Detroit Red Wings players
Grand Rapids Griffins players
Hamilton Bulldogs (AHL) players
Ice hockey players from Massachusetts
Maine Black Bears men's ice hockey players
Montreal Canadiens players
Rochester Americans players
Rockford IceHogs (AHL) players
San Antonio Rampage players
Tampa Bay Lightning players
USA Hockey National Team Development Program players
People from Agawam, Massachusetts
NCAA men's ice hockey national champions